The Diários Associados, or Associated Dailies, are a union of Brazilian communication media created by Assis Chateaubriand.

Diários Associados owned Rede Tupi, the first Brazilian television network, through its affiliate, the Rede de Emissoras Associadas, from 1950 to 1980.

Today the group has 50 vehicles of communication, consisting of 15 newspapers, 12 radio networks, 8 television networks, 9 Internet portals and 5 other sites, 1 foundation and 5 other companies.

Newspapers
 Correio Braziliense (pt) - Brasília - DF
 Diário Mercantil (pt) - Rio de Janeiro - RJ
 O Diário de Natal (pt) of Poti - Natal - RN
 Estado de Minas (pt) - Belo Horizonte - MG
 Diário de Pernambuco (pt) - Recife - PE
 Jornal do Commercio (pt) - Rio de Janeiro - RJ
 Diário da Borborema (pt) - Campina Grande-PB
 O Imparcial (pt) - São Luís - MA
 O Norte (pt) - João Pessoa - PB
 Monitor Campista (pt) - Campos - RJ
 Aqui BH (pt) - Belo Horizonte - BH
 Aqui DF (pt) - Brasília - DF
 Aqui PE (pt) - Recife - PE
 Aqui MA (pt) - Sao Luis - MA
 Aqui CE (pt) - Fortaleza-CE

Radio
 Guarani FM (pt) - Belo Horizonte - MG
 Super Rádio Tupi (pt), formerly Rádio Tupi - Rio de Janeiro - RJ
 Nativa FM (pt) - Rio de Janeiro - RJ
 Clube FM (pt) - Recife - PE
 Clube FM (pt) - Brasília - DF
 Clube FM (pt) - Natal - RN
 Clube FM (pt) - João Pessoa - PB
 Rádio Clube AM (pt) - Brasília - DF
 Rádio Clube AM (pt) - Recife - PE
 Rádio Clube AM (pt) - ampina Grande - PB
 Rádio Clube AM (pt) - Natal - PB
 Rádio Clube AM (pt) - Fortaleza - CE

Television
 TV Alterosa (pt) - Belo Horizonte - MG
 TV Alterosa (pt) - Divinópolis - MG
 TV Alterosa (pt) - Juiz de Fora - MG
 TV Alterosa (pt) - Varginha - MG
 TV Brasília (pt) - Brasília - DF
 TV Borborema (pt) - Campina Grande - PB
 TV Clube (pt) - Recife - PE
 TV Clube (pt) - João Pessoa - PB

Portals
 Correio Web (pt) - Brasília - DF
 Dnonline (pt) - Natal- RN
 DB online - Campina Grande (pt) - PB
 Pernambuco.com (pt) - Recife - PE
 Dnonline (pt) - Natal-RN
 O Norte online (pt) - João Pessoa - PB
 UAI (UAI|pt) - Belo Horizonte - MG

Other companies
 Fundação Assis Chateaubriand (pt) - Brasília - DF
 Teatro Alterosa (pt) - Belo Horizonte - BH
 Fazenda Manga (pt) - Manga - MG
 Alterosa Cine Video (pt) - Belo Horizonte - MG
 Revista Ragga (pt) - Belo Horizonte - MG
 D.A Press (pt) - Brasília - DF
 D.A Log (pt) - Brasília - DF
 Dzai (pt) - Belo Horizonte - MG

References

External links
  Diários Associados Official site
 Superesportes - DF, MG, PE

 
Companies based in Brasília
Mass media companies of Brazil
Newspaper companies of Brazil
Mass media in Brasília
1924 establishments in Brazil
Conglomerate companies of Brazil